Barclay Livingstone (born 1 April 1941) is a Canadian former yacht racer who competed in the 1960 Summer Olympics. Livingstone was born in Toronto, Ontario, Canada.

References

1941 births
Living people
Sportspeople from Toronto
Canadian male sailors (sport)
Olympic sailors of Canada
Sailors at the 1960 Summer Olympics – 5.5 Metre